Platycheirus ramsaerensis is a Palearctic species of hoverfly. It is found along the parts of northern Europe that face the Atlantic. It is a member of the Platycheirus clypeatus group

References

External links
Images representing Platycheirus ramsaerensis

Diptera of Europe
Syrphinae
Insects described in 1990